Forelsket i København is a 1960 Danish romance film directed by Finn Henriksen and starring Siw Malmkvist.

Cast

Siw Malmkvist as Maj Lindquist
Henning Moritzen as Jan Scharf
Ove Sprogøe as Carni
Jørgen Ryg as Dingo
Perry Knudsen as Stump
Dirch Passer as Kunstmaler Kobolski
Preben Mahrt as Teaterchef Steiner
Mimi Heinrich as Marlene Steiner
Håkan Westergren as Majoren
Sif Ruud as Majorskan
Keld Markuslund - Viceværten
Jakob Nielsen as Kaptajn
Ove Rud
Bjørn Spiro as Dirigent
Valsø Holm as Værtshusholder
Knud Schrøder as Værtshusholder
Christian Brochorst as Cafe-ejer
Carl Ottosen as Brandmand
Thecla Boesen as Påklæderske
Jytte Abildstrøm as Teatergæst
Else Leach 
Poul Thomsen as Matros
Gitte Wagner
Henry Lohmann as Falckredder

References

External links

1960 films
1960s romance films
1960s Danish-language films
Danish romance films
1960s Swedish-language films
Films directed by Finn Henriksen
Films set in Copenhagen
1960s multilingual films
Danish multilingual films
Films produced by Erik Balling